Kato Vermio-Seli (before 1926: Κάτω Σέλι - Kato Seli) is, primarily, an Aromanian (Vlach) Greek village and a community of the Veria municipality. Since the 2001 local government reform it is part of the municipality of Veria, of which is a municipal district. The 2011 census recorded 236 inhabitants in the village and  75 of them are permanent residents. .The altitude of the village is 1400-1550 meters, making it, probably, the highest populated village in Greece.There are about 1250 households in the village. The community of Kato Vermio-Seli covers an area of 38.915 km2.

Geography
Seli is located at a distance of 20 km from Veria and 90 km from Thessaloniki, in Imathia, Central Macedonia. The  altitude of the village is 1400-1550 meters, making it, probably, the highest populated village in Greece .

Climate
Seli has a humid continental climate (Dfb). Summers consist of mild to warm days with cool nights. Winters are very cold by Greek standards and snowy. The climate of Seli is somewhat moderated by the Mediterranean Sea, making extreme minimum and maximum temperatures rare.

Tourism
Seli is a winter sports resort located in the Vermion Mountains of northern Greece. There are many restored and newly built vacation homes, mountain cottages and chalets in the village, and the climate consists of cool summers and snowy winters. Most of the residents are native Greek-speaking Vlachs. The village has many inns & hotels and a few cafe-bars and restaurants or tavernas. During the summer months the population rises to 3000 people.

The ski lift in Seli village was the first one built in the entire country in 1934, making Seli the oldest ski resort in Greece.

See also
List of settlements in Imathia

References

External links
Official Seli Winter Resort website

Populated places in Imathia
Ski areas and resorts in Greece
Aromanian settlements in Greece